This article is a chronological (by publication) list of story arcs in the contemporary fantasy comic book series The Wicked + The Divine, created by writer Kieron Gillen and artist Jamie McKelvie.

Each issue features a quote by a character, which acts as a title for the chapter. Each story arc consists of five or six issues, which are collected and published in a trade paperback volume. Every two story arcs are collected and republished in a deluxe hardcover book. The series also has one-off issues outside the main story arcs, which are collected in a trade paperback after the series has finished.

Book One

The Faust Act
In Britain on January 1, 2014, Laura, a young girl and fan of The Pantheon, becomes embroiled in their inner politics after Lucifer takes an interest in her. She teams up with Cassandra, a reporter, to uncover the secrets they hold.

Fandemonium
A month after Lucifer's death, Laura teams up with Inanna to uncover the truth about who framed her, whilst dealing with the emergence of new Gods and her newfound fame as friend of The Pantheon. Meanwhile, Cassandra still seeks her big story about The Pantheon.

Book Two

Commercial Suicide
The Pantheon is reeling after the events of the last issue and each attempt to deal with their emotions in their individual ways, whilst also dealing with an inner threat unknown to them all. Each issue in this arc focuses on a different character in the comic and most featured an additional artist: Kate Brown (#12), Tula Lotay (#13), Stephanie Hans (#15), Leila del Duca (#16) and Brandon Graham (#17, except last page which was done by Jamie McKelvie). All issue's back quotes are from another character talking about the featured character. For the issues Jamie McKelvie did not contribute towards, he did an extra page of story resulting in the four Video Game additions.

Rising Action
A ghost from The Pantheon's past has supposedly come back to haunt them and a civil war has divided the Gods onto two sides.

Book Three

Imperial Phase (Part 1)
In the wake of the biggest shock in Pantheon history, the Gods now have no restraints in life. The first issue portrays an in-universe magazine featuring interviews with the Gods written by real journalists.

Imperial Phase (Part 2)
In the wake of a very public scandal, the Pantheon members prepare to fight one of their own and plan a party at the same time.

Book Four

Mothering Invention 
Taking us back through the ages of the Pantheon the first begins around 6,000 years ago when this has never happened before.

Okay 
The final arc.

Specials

Specials
Standalone specials written about Pantheons through the ages, featuring contributions by different artists.

References

Lists of comic book story arcs
American comics titles
Fantasy comics